Acrosomoides is a genus of African orb-weaver spiders first described by Eugène Simon in 1887.  it contains only three species.

Species
The following species are recognised in the genus Acrosomoides:
 Acrosomoides acrosomoides (O. Pickard-Cambridge, 1879) – Madagascar
 Acrosomoides linnaei (Walckenaer, 1841) – West, Central, East Africa
 Acrosomoides tetraedrus (Walckenaer, 1841) – Cameroon, Congo

References

Araneidae
Araneomorphae genera
Spiders of Africa
Taxa named by Eugène Simon